Plexiform layer may refer to:

 Inner plexiform layer
 Outer plexiform layer